Ifeanyi Benjamin Ede (born 5 December 1990) is a Nigerian professional footballer who plays as a forward.

Club career

Tirana
On 19 August 2016, Ede completed a transfer to Albania's most successful club Tirana as a free agent, signing a two-year contract. He was presented on the same day along with Romuald Ntsitsigui where he was allocated squad number 11. He made his debut a day later in the friendly against Apolonia Fier where he also netted his first goal. contributing in a 2–0 win at Selman Stërmasi Stadium. Later on 7 September, Ede played his first competitive match in the opening league match against Teuta Durrës which finished in a goalless draw; he played full-90 minutes. He scored his first goal in the matchday 5 against Flamurtari Vlorë, helping Tirana to get the first win of the season after four consecutive draws.

International career
In January 2014, coach Stephen Keshi, invited Ede to be included in the Nigeria national football team for the 2014 African Nations Championship. He helped the team to a third-place finish after Nigeria beat Zimbabwe by a goal to nil.

Career statistics

Honours
Tirana
 Albanian Cup: 2016–17

References

External links
Profile at soccerpunter.com

Living people
1996 births
Association football forwards
Nigerian footballers
Nigerian expatriate footballers
Nigeria international footballers
Enyimba F.C. players
Rangers International F.C. players
Ocean Boys F.C. players
KF Tirana players
Al-Nasr SC (Salalah) players
Fasil Kenema S.C. players
Kategoria Superiore players
Nigeria Professional Football League players
Nigeria A' international footballers
2014 African Nations Championship players
Expatriate footballers in Albania
Expatriate footballers in Ethiopia
Nigerian expatriate sportspeople in Albania
Nigerian expatriate sportspeople in Ethiopia